Seacom Skills University (SSU) is a private research university located in Bolpur, West Bengal, on the Bolpur-Siuri road.

Approval 
It is established under West Bengal Government's policy (Vide Official Gazette Notification No.: 142-Edn (U) dated 31/01/2013), in line with the provisions under section 2(f) of the University Grant Commission (UGC) Act, 1956, and has been passed as Seacom Skills University Act, 2014 by the West Bengal Legislative Assembly (West Bengal Act VI of 2014) which received the assent of the Governor of West Bengal on 11 April 2014 (Vide Official Gazette Notification no. 396- Edn(U) / OM-155L / 2012).

Schools at SSU
 School of Engineering and Technology
 School of Management
 School of Computer Applications
 School of Agriculture
 School of Legal Studies 
 School of Sciences
 School of Hospitality 
 School of Social Sciences
 School of Pharmacy
 School of Creative Art and Design
 School of Marine Engineering
 School of Commerce
 School of Languages
 School of Vocational Studies

Admission

Admission in Seacom Skills University for B-Tech students is based on the West Bengal Joint entrance examination(WBJEE), and diploma students are based on jexpo and voclet. For other courses are based on the University's own Entrance examination Seacom Skills University Joint Entrance Examination (SJEE).

Cultural events
Rabindra Joyonty
Basanto Utsav
Saraswati Puja
Viswakarma Puja
National yoga day
SSU Ritmo Fest

References

 Private universities in India
 Educational institutions established in 2014
 Universities and colleges in Birbhum district
2014 establishments in West Bengal